Carl De Marco is a Canadian sports agent best known for being the President of World Wrestling Federation Canada (now WWE Canada) from 1995 to 2009. He is also the business manager of professional wrestler Bret Hart.

Awards and recognitions
 Canadian Wrestling Hall of Fame
 Class of 1998

See also
 List of WWE personnel

References

Further reading
Books
 
 
 
 

Magazines

External links
 

Living people
Canadian sports agents
WWE executives
Date of birth missing (living people)
Year of birth missing (living people)